Akaki Mgeladze (1910–1980) was a Soviet politician. He served as First Secretary of the Georgian Communist Party from 1952 to 1953, and before that was First Secretary of the Communist Party of Abkhazia from 1943 until 1951, as well as previously leading both the Georgian and Abkhazian Komsomol and Gruzneft.

Life and career

Pre-WW2

Born in the Guria region of Georgia, Mgeladze had grown up in Abkhazia and was serving with the military on the Transcaucasian Front when he was appointed head of the Communist Party of Abkhazia by Joseph Stalin. Under Mgeladze, Georgian was made the language of instruction in Abkhazia, replacing Abkhaz and Russian at the start of the 1945–46 academic year.

Friendship with Stalin
After the Second World War, Mgeladze became a confidant of Stalin, who nicknamed him “Comrade Wolf”. He made a declaration that Abkhazia would produce lemons for the entirety of the Soviet Union after Stalin repeatedly showed him lemon trees. Using his influence with Stalin, Mgeladze manoeuvred against head of the Ministry of State Security Lavrenti Beria, denouncing his corruption and that of Stalin’s other confidant Candide Charkviani, who was an ally of Beria. Mgeladze succeeded in convincing Stalin to turn against Charkviani and strengthened his distrust of Beria. In March 1952 Mgeladze was appointed First Secretary of the Georgian Communist Party by Beria, replacing Charkviani.

Resignation and later life
He held his position until he was forced out by Beria in April 1953, after the death of Stalin. Forced to admit that he took bribes while head of the Communist Party of Abkhazia, Mgeladze was only able to remain a Party member because his successor in Georgia, Aleksandre Mirtskhulava, refused to expel him. After that he served as the chairman of the Bibnisi collective farm, located in the Kareli district of Georgia.

Mgeladze wrote a memoir, Сталин Каким я его знал: Страницы недавнего прошлого (Stalin As I Knew Him: Pages of the Recent Past), and died in 1980. For his efforts Mgeladze was twice awarded with the Order of Lenin, as well as the Order of the Red Banner, Order of the Red Star, Order of the Patriotic War, and others.

References

Sources
 Mgeladze, Akaki. Сталин Каким я его знал: Страницы недавнего прошлого (Stalin As I Knew Him: Pages of the Recent Past), 2001.
 Suny, Ronald Grigor. The Making of the Georgian Nation. Bloomington, Indiana: Indiana University Press, 1994.

1910 births
1980 deaths
First Secretaries of the Georgian Communist Party
Party leaders of the Soviet Union
People from Guria
People from Kutais Governorate
Recipients of the Order of Lenin
Recipients of the Order of the Red Banner